Ouédraogo, sometimes Ouedraogo, is a surname taken from the French spelling of Wedraogo, semi-legendary son of princess Yennenga and founder of the Mossi Kingdoms (in modern-day Burkina Faso).

The surname may refer to:

Abdul Moustapha Ouedraogo (born 1988), Ivorian footballer
Ablassé Ouedraogo (born 1953), Burkinabé economist and politician
Adama Ouedraogo (born 1987), Burkinabé swimmer
Alassane Ouédraogo (born 1980), Burkinabé footballer
Ali Ouédraogo (born 1976), Burkinabé footballer
Alice Ouédraogo (born 1955), Burkinabé lawyer and public health official
Ambroise Ouédraogo (born 1948), Nigerian Roman Catholic bishop
Angèle Bassolé-Ouédraogo (born 1967), Canadian poet and journalist
Angelika Ouedraogo (born 1993), Burkinabé swimmer
Antoinette Ouédraogo, Burkinabé lawyer
Élodie Ouédraogo (born 1981), Belgian sprinter
Fulgence Ouedraogo (born 1986), French rugby union player
Gérard Kango Ouédraogo (born 1925), Burkinabé politician and Prime Minister of Burkina Faso
Gilbert Noël Ouédraogo (born 1968), Burkinabé politician
Hamado Ouedraogo (born 1983), Burkinabé footballer
Hermann Ouédraogo (born 1981), Burkinabé footballer
Idrissa Ouedraogo (1954–2018), Burkinabé film director
Ismaël Ouedraogo (born 1991), Burkinabé footballer
Issiaka Ouédraogo (born 1988), Burkinabé footballer
Jean-Baptiste Ouédraogo (born 1942), Burkinabé physician and President of Burkina Faso
Joseph Ouédraogo, Burkinabé politician
Joséphine Ouédraogo (born 1949), Burkinabé sociologist and politician
Kadré Désiré Ouedraogo (born 1953), Burkinabé politician and Prime Minister of Burkina Faso
Kassoum Ouédraogo (born 1966), Burkinabé footballer
Mamadou Ouédraogo (1906–1978), Burkinabé politician
Marie Françoise Ouedraogo (born 1967), Burkinabé mathematician
Philippe Ouédraogo (cardinal) (born 1945), cardinal from Burkina Faso
Philippe Ouédraogo (politician) (born 1942), politician from Burkina Faso
Rabaki Jérémie Ouédraogo (born 1973), Burkinabé cyclist
Rahim Ouédraogo (born 1980), Burkinabé footballer
Ram Ouédraogo (born 1950), Burkinabé politician
Samuel Ouedraogo (born 1987), Burkinabé basketball player
Youssouf Ouédraogo (1952–2017), Burkinabé politician and Prime Minister of Burkina Faso

References

Surnames of Burkinabé origin